The 2019 Drake Bulldogs football team represented Drake University as a member of the Pioneer Football League (PFL) during 2019 NCAA Division I FCS football season. Led by first-year head coach Todd Stepsis, the Bulldogs compiled an overall record of 6–5 with a mark of 6–2 in conference play, tying for second place in the PFL. The team played its home games at Drake Stadium in Des Moines, Iowa.

Previous season

The Bulldogs finished the 2018 season 7–4, 6-2 in PFL play to finish in a tie for second place.

Preseason

Coaching changes
In January 2019, it was announced that with the resignation of 5-year head coach Rick Fox, that defensive coordinator, Todd Stepsis would be promoted to head coach.

Preseason coaches' poll
The Pioneer League released their preseason coaches' poll on July 30, 2019. The Bulldogs were picked to finish in third place.

Preseason All–PFL teams
The Bulldogs had eleven players selected to the preseason all–PFL teams.

Offense

Second team

Steve Doran – WR

Grant Snow – OL

Defense

First team

Nathan Clayberg – DL

Gavin Dineen – DL

Kieran Severa – LB

Jabari Butler – DB

Will Warner – DB

Second team

Erin Morgan – DL

Connor Willis – LB

Sean Lynch – DB

Special teams

First team

Danny Donley – K

Schedule

Game summaries

at North Dakota

Truman

at South Dakota State

at Marist

Valparaiso

at Butler

Morehead State

at San Diego

Jacksonville

Dayton

at Davidson

References

Drake
Drake Bulldogs football seasons
Drake Bulldogs football